Patrick Lau Sau-shing  is a Hong Kong architect, legislative councillor, educator and civil servant. He had been a representative on the Legislative Council of Hong Kong (LegCo) as a member for the Architectural, Surveying and Planning Functional Constituency, as well as a member of the Professional Forum party, between 2004 and 2012.

Between 1996 and 2000, he was head of the Department of Architecture, The University of Hong Kong.

Background
Lau was a student of St Paul's College, Hong Kong. After going to Canada, he graduated from the University of Manitoba in 1969 and returned to Hong Kong to teach at the University of Hong Kong in 1973. He earned his Master of Business Administration in 1988.  From 1996 to 2000, he served as the head of the Department of Architecture, The University of Hong Kong. He is a Fellow Member and Past President of the Hong Kong Institute of Architects (HKIA) as well as Honorary University Fellow, Honorary Professor and former Head/Professor of Architecture at the University of Hong Kong.

He is a designer for the following schools in Hong Kong:
 French International School
 Hong Kong International School 
 West Island School

Affiliations
 Hong Kong Housing Authority

References

External links
 Members' Biographies, Legislative Council of Hong Kong

1944 births
Living people
Hong Kong architects
Academic staff of the University of Hong Kong
Hong Kong civil servants
Alumni of St. Paul's College, Hong Kong
University of Manitoba alumni
Macau emigrants to Hong Kong
Professional Forum politicians
HK LegCo Members 2004–2008
HK LegCo Members 2008–2012
Recipients of the Silver Bauhinia Star